The Pitchfork Music Festival Paris 2013 was held on 31 October to 2 November 2013 at the Grande halle de la Villette, Paris, France. The festival was headlined by The Knife, Disclosure and Hot Chip.

Lineup
Headline performers are listed in boldface. Artists listed from latest to earliest set times.

Opening Night and After Party lineups
The opening night was held on 30 October 2013 at Le Trabendo. The after parties were held in collaboration with Red Bull Music Academy at Le Trabendo on 31 October and 1 November 2013.

References

External links

Pitchfork Music Festival
2013 music festivals